Dermomurex trondleorum is a species of sea snail, a marine gastropod mollusk in the family Muricidae, the murex snails or rock snails.

Description
The shell grows to a length of 17 mm. It is found in bottom sediments and feeds on prey.

Distribution
This marine species occurs off French Polynesia and the Tuamotus.

References

 Houart, R., 1990. Description of two new species of Muricidae (Gastropoda) from french Polynesia. Apex 5(1-2): 7-12
 Merle D., Garrigues B. & Pointier J.-P. (2011) Fossil and Recent Muricidae of the world. Part Muricinae. Hackenheim: Conchbooks. 648 pp. page(s): 223

External links
 MNHN, Paris: holotype

Dermomurex
Gastropods described in 1990